The Whitney Glacier is a glacier situated on Mount Shasta, in the U.S. state of California. The Whitney Glacier is the longest glacier and the only valley glacier in California. In area and volume, it ranks second in the state behind the nearby Hotlum Glacier.

Advance
In 2002, scientists made the first detailed survey of Mount Shasta's glaciers in 50 years. They found that seven of the glaciers have grown over the period 1951–2002, with the Hotlum and Wintun Glaciers nearly doubling, the Bolam Glacier increasing by half, and the Whitney and Konwakiton Glaciers growing by a third.  The study concluded that though there has been a two to three degree Celsius temperature rise in the region, there has also been a corresponding increase in the amount of snowfall. Increased temperatures have tapped Pacific Ocean moisture, leading to snowfalls that supply the accumulation zone of the glacier with 40 percent more snowfall than is melted in the ablation zone. Over the past 50 years, the glacier has actually expanded 30 percent, which is the opposite of what is being observed in most areas of the world. Researchers have also stated that if the global warming forecast for the upcoming next 100 years are accurate, the increased snowfall will not be enough to offset the increased melting, and the glacier is then likely to retreat.

Whitney Glacier, along with the Hubbard Glacier in Alaska, are larger now than in 1890. However, Hubbard Glacier, along with a few other notable glaciers whose termini are at sea level, are calving glaciers.

See also
List of glaciers

Notes

References
Bill Guyton (2001). Glaciers of California: Modern Glaciers, Ice Age Glaciers, the Origin of the Yosemite Valley, and a Glacier Tour in the Sierra Nevada. University of California Press. .

Glaciers of Mount Shasta